The counts of Nevers were the rulers of the County of Nevers, which became a French duchy in 1539, with the rulers of the duchy calling themselves dukes.

History 
The history of the County of Nevers is closely connected to the Duchy of Burgundy. The counts also held the County of Auxerre in the 11th and 12th centuries, and the county was held by the count of Flanders and then the duke of Burgundy again in the 14th century.

In 1539, it was directly annexed to France and became a duchy in the peerage of France. For a time, it was held by a cadet branch of the House of Gonzaga. This branch inherited the Duchy of Mantua from the senior Gonzaga line (when it became extinct in 1627) and ruled Mantua until 1708, when the branch died out in the male line.

Charles IV Gonzaga sold the duchies of Nevers and Rethel in 1659 to Cardinal Mazarin. His family held the duchy of Nevers until the French Revolution.

Counts of Nevers

Otto-Henry (c.973–987; Duke of Burgundy, 965–1002)
Otto-William (987–992; Duke of Burgundy (contender), 1002–1004)
Landri (992–1028)
Renaud I (also Count of Auxerre, 1031–1040)
William I (also Count of Auxerre, 1040–1083)
Renaud II (also Count of Auxerre, 1083–1097)
William II (also Count of Auxerre, 1097–1148)
William III (also Count of Auxerre, 1148–1161)
William IV (also Count of Auxerre, 1161–1168)
Guy (also Count of Auxerre, 1168–1175)
William V (also Count of Auxerre, 1175–1181)
Agnes I (1181–1192)
Peter II of Courtenay (1184–1192; Latin Emperor, 1216–1217)
Matilda I (1192–1257)
Hervé IV of Donzy (1199–1223)
 Agnes of Donzy, who married Philip, Dauphin of France, then Guy II of Saint-Pol
 Yolande I, Countess of Nevers, who married Archambaud IX of Bourbon, had Matilda II
Guigues of Forez (1226–1241)
Matilda II (also Countess of Auxerre, 1257–1262)
Odo (also Count of Auxerre, 1257–1262)
Yolande II (1262–1280)
John Tristan (1265–1270)
Robert III of Bethune (1272–1280)
Louis I (1280–1322)
Louis II (also Count of Flanders, 1322–1346)
Louis III (also Count of Flanders, 1346–1384) (on his death, the title passed directly to his grandson John, although John's mother Margaret, Countess of Flanders, and her husband Philip II, Duke of Burgundy received other titles)
John I (1384–1404; Duke of Burgundy, 1404–1419)
Philip II (1404–1415)
Charles I (1415–1464)
John II (1464–1491)
Engelbert of Cleves (1491–1506)
Charles II, Count of Nevers (1506–1521)

Dukes of Nevers

Rulers of the Duchy of Nivernais.
François I (1521–1562) (His mother, Marie of Albret (d. 1549), widow of Charles II, also took the title in 1539, even though it was her son and his wife who became the actual duke and duchess.)
François II (1562–1563)
Jacques (1563–1564)
Henriette of Cleves (1564–1601)
Louis Gonzaga (1566–1595)
Charles III Gonzaga (1595–1637)
Charles IV Gonzaga (1637–1659), sold the Duchies of Nevers and Rethel in 1659 to Cardinal Mazarin
Jules Mazarin (1659–1661)
Philippe Jules Mancini (1661–1707)
Philip Julius Francis Mancini (1707–1768)
Louis-Jules Mancini (1768–1798)

External links
Nevers and the Counts of Nevers

 
 
Nevers
Nevers
Nevers
Nevers